The Talker is a 1925 American silent drama film directed by Alfred E. Green and starring Anna Q. Nilsson, Lewis Stone, and Shirley Mason.

Plot
As described in a film magazine review, Kate Lennox, dissatisfied with the suburban home she and her husband have purchased, makes the first payment on an automobile. Her husband, not knowing of it, when he gets a raise to his salary puts all his money towards paying for the home. Kate advocates in print that each woman should have three husbands, one to provide, one to entertain, and one to run the house. In reality, she is unable to yield to the kiss of another man. Her husband's sister Ruth, taking the writing for gospel, runs away with a married man who is short on his accounts. The Lenoxes part because of this, but are later reconciled. Ruth returns after a year to find her lover still waiting for her.

Cast

References

Bibliography
 Monaco, James. The Encyclopedia of Film. Perigee Books, 1991.

External links

1925 films
1925 drama films
Silent American drama films
Films directed by Alfred E. Green
American silent feature films
1920s English-language films
First National Pictures films
American black-and-white films
1920s American films